Archibald Norman, MBE, FRCP (19 July 1912 – 20 December 2016) was a British paediatrician, described in an obituary as "a pioneer in the treatment of respiratory diseases in children".

Archie Norman was born in Oban, Scotland, the son of Mary (née MacCallum), a nurse, and George Norman, a radiologist. he was educated at Charterhouse School, then studied medicine at Cambridge University.

He was appointed as assistant Tuberculosis Officer at Middlesex County Council in 1939, before undertaking war service from 1940 to 1945, during which time he was a prisoner of war and led 150 troops to freedom after their liberation by Russian forces, for which he was made a Member of the Order of the British Empire (MBE) in 1945.

From 1950 he was a physician  at Great Ormond Street Hospital, from where he retired in 1977.

He served as Chairman of the Research Committee of the Cystic Fibrosis Trust from 1978 to 1984.

The Children's Trust's residential rehabilitation centre at Tadworth is named in his honour.

He died on 20 December 2016, aged 104.

References

External links 

 

1912 births
2016 deaths
People educated at Charterhouse School
Alumni of the University of Cambridge
Place of death missing
British paediatricians
Members of the Order of the British Empire
Fellows of the Royal College of Physicians
British medical researchers
British centenarians
Men centenarians
Physicians of Great Ormond Street Hospital